Arnelliaceae is a family of liverworts belonging to the order Jungermanniales. It contains a single genus, Arnellia.

The genus name of Arnellia is in honour of Hampus Wilhelm Arnell (2 August 1848 in Härnösand – 1932 in Uppsala), a Swedish bryologist.

References

Jungermanniales
Jungermanniales genera